Richard Prideaux (1606–1667) was an English politician who sat in the House of Commons in 1640.

Prideaux was the son of Jonathan Prideaux (d.1637), of Theuborough in the parish of Sutcombe, Devon. He matriculated at Exeter College, Oxford on 13 December 1622, aged 16. He lived at Theuborough. In April 1640, he was elected Member of Parliament for Bodmin in the Short Parliament.  
 
Prideaux died at the age of 61.

References

1606 births
1667 deaths
Members of the pre-1707 English Parliament for constituencies in Cornwall
English MPs 1640 (April)